Ronald Davies (25 July 1919 – 5 June 1980) was an Australian politician. Born in Latrobe, Tasmania, he was educated at state schools and then the University of Tasmania, becoming a teacher. He served in the military 1942–1945. In 1958, he was elected to the Australian House of Representatives as the Labor member for Braddon, defeating Liberal MP Aubrey Luck.  He was only the second Labor member ever to win the seat, previously known as Darwin, and the first since 1917.  He held the seat until 1975, when he was defeated by Liberal candidate and future Premier of Tasmania Ray Groom. Davies died in 1980. His son Glen served in the Tasmanian House of Assembly from 1972 to 1986.

References

Australian Labor Party members of the Parliament of Australia
Members of the Australian House of Representatives for Braddon
Members of the Australian House of Representatives
1919 births
1980 deaths
People from Latrobe, Tasmania
20th-century Australian politicians